Ford Performance (formerly Ford Racing) is the high-performance division of the Ford Motor Company and the multinational name used for its motorsport and racing activity.

History
 1896 – Henry Ford reached a top speed of 20 mph in his first car, Quadricycle.
 1901 – Henry Ford defeated Alexander Winton (the most accomplished automobile builder/racer of the era) in a 10-lap race on a one-mile oval at the Detroit Driving Club, Grosse Pointe, Michigan. He overcame his rival's more powerful car in Sweepstakes, a racing car of his own design.
 1902 – Ford 999 (named after a famous New York Central train), driven by Barney Oldfield, Master Driver of the World and America's Legendary Speed King, defeated Alex Winton at Grosse Point in the 999 as a result of the publicity and financial backing of Alex J. Malcomson the Ford Motor Company was launched
 1903 – Ford 999, driven by Oldfield, lapped the Indiana Fairgrounds dirt track at a then-record 60 mph?
 1904 – Henry Ford, driving his rebuilt 999, sets the world one mile record on a frozen lake near Detroit.
 1904 – Frank Kulick drove a Ford 20 hp racer to the one and five mile world track record for middleweight racers.
 1907 – Kulick set the world 24-hour track endurance record, traveling 1135 miles driving a Ford six cyl Model K.
 1909 – A Ford Model T won the transcontinental New York to Seattle cross-country race (about 3600 km).
 1932 – Ford introduced its V-8 Flathead engine, bringing V-8 power into mass production with the slogan "Everyman’s power for the road, and Everyman’s power for racing".
 1932 – Two car mechanics win the Swedish Winter Grand Prix driving a Ford special.
 1936 – Ionel Zamfirescu and P. G. Cristea won the Monte Carlo Rally driving a Ford V8 "Flathead".
 1949 – Jim Roper, driving a Lincoln, won the first NASCAR race.
 1950 – Jimmy Florian, driving a Ford, wins Ford's First NASCAR win a Ford brand vehicle Dayton Ohio
 1963 -  Tiny Lund wins 1st Daytona 500 for Ford.
 1965 - Jim Clark gives Ford its 1st of 6 Indy wins between 1965 and 1971. source: https://us.motorsport.com/vintage/news/irl-ford-clinches-first-indianapolis-500-win/1884686/
 1967 – Jim Clark, driving a Lotus-Ford, won the Dutch Grand Prix. This is Ford's first grand prix victory.
 1976 - Ford via Cosworth  won its 1st Indy 500 and would dominate Indy with the Cosworth DFX over the next 10 years by winning every race plus 2 more with the XB version for a 12 Indy win total between 1978 and 1996 The Ford-Cosworth DFX powered 81 consecutive Indy car victories from 1981 to 1986, and 153 victories total. Won all USAC and CART championships between 1977 and 1987. Source - https://www.museumofamericanspeed.com/cosworthindyengine.html
1994 - Michael Schumacher bags his first driver's world championship with Ford-powered Benetton B194 car.
 2000 -  Dale Jarett wins Ford's 10th Daytona 500.
 2003 – Giancarlo Fisichella, driving a Jordan-Ford, won the Brazilian Grand Prix. This is Ford's 176th and last Grand Prix victory.
 2011 – Trevor Bayne wins the Daytona 500 in a 1–2–3 finish for Ford. It was Ford's 600th NASCAR victory.
 2012 – Michael Shank Racing wins the 50th Rolex 24 at Daytona with a Ford engined Riley chassis (Allmendinger/Negri/Pew/Wilson), Starworks Motorsport finishes 2nd in Grand-Am Daytona Prototype driver standings (Ryan Dalziel), and wins the 1st North American Endurance Championship, also with Ford power.
 2013 – Greg Biffle wins the Quicken Loans 400, Ford's 1000th NASCAR win. 
 2014 – Debut of the Ford EcoBoost twin turbo engine for the TUDOR United SportsCar Championship, Chip Ganassi Racing with Felix Sabates win the Mobil 1 12 Hours of Sebring using the engine.
 2015 – Ford Racing, alongside Ford Team RS and Special Vehicle Team, merged into a global entity named Ford Performance, as they also will make 12 performance cars by 2020. Wins Rolex 24 Hours of Daytona overall with Chip Ganassi Racing with Felix Sabates (Kanaan/ McMurray/ Larson / Dixon) using Ford Ecoboost Riley DP.
 2016 – Ford entered four Ford GT cars in the 2016 24 Hours of Le Mans GTE Pro class, finished 1–3–4–10.
 2018 – Joey Logano wins at Homestead Miami Speedway and wins Ford Performance its first NASCAR cup championship since 2004 and First Manufacturer's Championship since 2002.
 2023 – Ford announced their return as a Formula 1 engine manufacturer for 2026 after nearly 20 years of absence in Formula 1 and will partner with Red Bull Powertrains as Red Bull Ford Powertrains. Red Bull Ford Powertrains will supply engines to Red Bull Racing and Scuderia AlphaTauri.

Vehicles
This list only includes vehicles produced post 2016 after the merger of Ford Team RS and Special Vehicle Team,

Currently sold
Ford Edge ST
Ford Explorer ST
Ford F-150 Raptor
Ford GT
Ford Mustang Shelby GT500

Previously sold 
Ford Fiesta ST
Ford Focus ST
Ford Focus RS
Ford Mustang Shelby GT350/GT350R

Wins

Ford Performance teams

Formula One
Red Bull Racing (2026)
Scuderia AlphaTauri (2026)

NASCAR

Cup Series
Team Penske (1994–2002, 2013–present)
RFK Racing (1988–present)
Wood Brothers Racing (1950–present)
Front Row Motorsports (2010–present)
Stewart-Haas Racing (2017–present)
Rick Ware Racing (2022–present)
Team Hezeberg (2022–present)

Xfinity Series
RSS Racing (2021–present)
SS-Green Light Racing (2022–present)
Stewart-Haas Racing (2017–present)
AM Racing  (2023-present)

Truck Series
Thorsport Racing (2018-2020) (2023–present)
Front Row Motorsports (2020–present)
AM Racing (2023-present)

World Rally Championship
M-Sport Ford World Rally Team (2013–present)

FIA World Rallycross Championship
 Olsbergs MSE (2014–2015, 2018–present)

WeatherTech Sportscar Championship and FIA World Endurance Championship
Chip Ganassi Racing

Australia Supercars Championship
Blanchard Racing Team (2021-present)
Dick Johnson Racing
Grove Racing (2020-present)
Tickford Racing (2003-present)
Walkinshaw Andretti United (2023-present)

Past teams
Matech GT Racing, SunTrust Racing, Ford World Rally Team, Munchi's Ford World Rally Team, Richard Petty Motorsports, Jordan Grand Prix, Stewart Grand Prix, Jaguar Racing, Benetton Formula, Minardi F1 Team, Team Aon, Marc VDS Racing Team, Belgian Racing, Fischer Racing, FWRT, Hoonigan Racing Division

See also
Ford Performance Vehicles Special Vehicle Team (SVT), North America's performance car division
Ford TeamRS European performance car divisions (Ford's ST and RS)
Ford Performance Vehicles (FPV), Australia's performance car division
Ford Special Vehicle Operations (SVO)
Cosworth, former long standing performance engine development partner
Roush Performance
M-Sport

References

External links

 

Ford Performance
Formula One engine manufacturers
Official motorsports and performance division of automakers
American racecar constructors